Jail Busters is a 1955 film starring the comedy team of The Bowery Boys.  The film was released on September 18, 1955 by Allied Artists and is the thirty-ninth film in the series.

Plot
Chuck gets a job working for a newspaper. When promoted, he has to go under cover in the state prison to dig up some information on some of the inmates. When one of the inmates beats Chuck up and lands him in the hospital, it's up to Slip, Sach, and Butch to finish Chuck's job. Slip decides that he and the boys should commit a crime so that they can be sent to jail. Another reporter, Cy Bowman, agrees to inform the penitentiary that the boys are working under cover for the newspaper once they get arrested. However, Bowman does not keep his promise. The trio are forced to spend what they think is a short sentence in jail. While there, the boys dig up some information on Percival P. Lannigan and some other inmates who have been living it up in jail, unknown to the warden. Lannigan soon gets word that Slip and his pals are under cover for Chuck (whom Lannigan had beaten up earlier), and intends to have Chuck and Louie killed.  The boys eventually expose the inmates scam and turn them over to the warden, who pardons them and arranges for their release.

Cast

The Bowery Boys
Leo Gorcey as Terence Aloysius 'Slip' Mahoney
Huntz Hall as Horace Debussy 'Sach' Jones
David Gorcey as Charles 'Chuck' Anderson (Credited as David Condon)
Bennie Bartlett as Butch Williams

Remaining cast
Bernard Gorcey as Louie Dumbrowski
Barton MacLane as Captain Jenkins, head guard
Anthony Caruso as Percival P. Lannigan
Percy Helton as Warden B.W. Oswald
Lyle Talbot as Cy Bowman
Michael Ross as Big Greenie
Joahn Harmon as Tomcyk
Murray Alper as Gus

Cast notes
After the death of Bernard Gorcey, just seven days before this film was released, Percy Helton, who played the warden in this film, was one of the choices for taking the place of Gorcey's character, Louie Dumbrowski. Two years later he would play the character of Mike Clancy, a character similar to Louie, in the film Spook Chasers.

Production
Jail Busters was filmed under the working title of Doing Time and is the only film in the series with no females in the cast.

Home media
Warner Archives released the film on made-to-order DVD in the United States as part of "The Bowery Boys, Volume Four" on August 26, 2014.

See also
List of American films of 1955

References

External links
 
 

1955 films
1955 comedy films
American black-and-white films
American comedy films
Bowery Boys films
1950s English-language films
Films directed by William Beaudine
Allied Artists films
1950s American films